Ángel Carvajal Bernal (1901–1985) was a Mexican politician.

1901 births
1985 deaths
Politicians from Veracruz
Mexican Secretaries of the Interior
Mexican Secretaries of Energy
Institutional Revolutionary Party politicians
Governors of Veracruz